is a Japan-exclusive fighting game for the PlayStation developed by Ganbarion and published by Bandai in 2002. It is the second game in the One Piece: Grand Battle! series and the seventh game to be based on the One Piece manga and anime. Similar to the first game, this game uses the song "We Are!" from the One Piece anime, but with different lyrics, which is known as "We Are! Super-EX ver.".

Plot
After Luffy and his crew make it to the grand line, they are faced by an organization of bounty hunters called Baroque Works. This game covers the Alabasta Saga.

Gameplay
Similar to the first game, two characters will duke it out in a 3D arena with items and obstacles. However, more characters, stages and features are added.

Returning characters
 Monkey D. Luffy
 Roronoa Zoro
 Nami
 Usopp
 Vinsmoke Sanji (written as "Sanji")
 Kuro
 Don Krieg
 Arlong
 Buggy
 Alvida
 Chaser
 Tashigi
 Nefertari Vivi (written as "Vivi")
 Pandaman
 Mihawk
 Shanks

New characters
 Tony Tony Chopper
 Nico Robin (written as Miss All Sunday)
 Wapol
 Karoo
 Portgas D. Ace
 Crocodile (written as "Mr. 0 Crocodile")
 Bentham (written as "Mr. 2 Bon Clay")
 Galdino (written as "Mr. 3")

Support characters

Soundtrack
A CD featuring the game's music was released under the title, "One Piece Grand Battle! 2 Music and Song Collection."

PocketStation
Another One Piece game was available with this game using the PocketStation portable device, it was a role-playing game taking place during the Alabasta arc with a new original character.

Notes

References

External links
From TV Animation - One Piece Grand Battle! 2 at Bandai (in Japanese)
From TV Animation - One Piece Grand Battle! 2 at GameFAQs

2002 video games
Bandai games
Ganbarion games
Japan-exclusive video games
Multiplayer and single-player video games
One Piece games
PlayStation (console) games
PlayStation (console)-only games
Toei Animation video game projects
Video games developed in Japan